The Second Three Years is a compilation album by singer-songwriter Frank Turner, released 18 November 2011 through Xtra Mile Recordings and 16 January 2012 through Epitaph Records.

The album compiles material recorded after the release of Turner's first compilation, The First Three Years, that does not appear on either of Turner's two successive studio albums, including tracks from EPs, singles, covers and unreleased material.

Track listing

References

Frank Turner albums
Epitaph Records albums
2011 compilation albums